Ksenia Milevskaya (born 9 August 1990) is a former tennis player from Belarus.

On 9 June 2007, Milevskaya and Urszula Radwańska won the 2007 French Open – Girls' doubles title, beating Sorana Cîrstea and Alexa Glatch in the final, and on 8 September 2007, they continued their unbeaten match-streak as a doubles team by winning the 2007 US Open – Girls' doubles title, beating Oksana Kalashnikova and Ksenia Lykina in the final.

In singles competitions at the juniors level, Milevskaya has lost in the semifinals of three of the 2007 Grand Slams – the  Australian Open, the French Open, and the US Open, losing to Madison Brengle, Alizé Cornet, and her doubles partner Urszula Radwańska, respectively. In 2006, she made it to the Orange Bowl singles final, but lost in straight sets to Nikola Hofmanova.

As of 9 September 2007, she was the second ranked junior of the world.

She lived in Minsk and trained at the Weil Tennis Academy & College Prep School in Ojai, California, United States, where her coach was Nicolas Beuque. Her brother, Artem Milevskyi, played for the Ukraine national football team.

ITF Circuit finals

Singles: 10 (6–4)

Doubles: 21 (10–11)

Junior Grand Slam finals

Doubles: 2 (2–0)

External links
 
 
 

1990 births
Living people
Belarusian female tennis players
French Open junior champions
Tennis players from Minsk
US Open (tennis) junior champions
Grand Slam (tennis) champions in girls' doubles
21st-century Belarusian women